Gustav Johann Georg Hellmann or Georg Gustav Hellmann (3 July 1854 – 21 February 1939) was a German meteorologist.

Hellmann was born in Löwen (Lewin Brzeski), Prussian Silesia. Since 1907 to 1922, he was the principal of the Preußischen Meteorologischen Institut (Prussian Meteorological Institute) in Berlin. He died in Berlin.

Works 
 An editor of the "Meteorologische Zeitschrift" 1892-1907 (with Julius von Hann)
 Repertorium der Deutschen Meteorologie, 1883

Work with snowflakes 
In 1892 Hellmann piqued an interest in pictures of snowflakes, after seeing some of Wilson Bentley's photography, he commissioned a microphotographer to take shots of snowflakes to study. Upon review of these microphotographs, Hellmann noted a large difference in the snowflake pictures he took, and the ones Wilson Bentley had taken. Hellmann's snowflakes were irregular, there were various types, sizes, shapes, and forms. Bentley's snowflakes however, were perfect, symmetrical, six-sided and reminiscent of stars. Hellmann was perplexed by this, and openly questioned the accuracy of Bentley's work. He accused Bentley of manipulating the snowflake to get these perfect results. Bentley eventually admitted to somewhat doctoring the photographs, by scraping emulsion off the negatives, but he claimed that this did not change the integrity or accuracy of the photograph. This argument persisted for years, Hellmann insisted that altering the snowflake was unethical, as it misrepresented the snowflake in its truest form, Bentley argued the opposite. Although the argument never formally ended with one side winning, it is still Bentley's snowflake the world thinks of when they see snow fall.

Hellmann number 
In Germany and especially the Netherlands, Hellmann is known for the Hellmann number, a measure for the severity of a winter. This figure is derived by adding up all negative temperatures in the period of 1 November of the previous year up to and including 31 March of the current year.

See also
Wind gradient

References

External links
 MeteoKust / KiteMeteo - De ultieme kustwebsite met webcams aan zee at www.infometeo.be (about his meter; Flemish)
 NEWI Meteo Fijnaart: Weerkundig woordenboek -H- at home.planet.nl (about his meter; Flemish)
 Jubilaeen 2003 at fa-gem.dmg-ev.de (German)
 Chronik: Berlin am 3. Juli, Fakten Jahr für Jahr at www.luise-berlin.de (German)
 Hellmann numbers for the Bilt from 1901 at knmi.nl (Dutch)

1854 births
1939 deaths
German meteorologists
Members of the Prussian Academy of Sciences
People from the Province of Silesia
People from Brzeg County